Chris Hazzard (born 20 August 1984) is an Irish politician from Sinn Féin who has been the Member of Parliament (MP) for South Down since the 2017 United Kingdom general election, when he defeated incumbent Margaret Ritchie of the Social Democratic and Labour Party. Due to Sinn Féin's policy of abstentionism with regard to the Westminster Parliament, Hazzard has not taken his seat.

Early life
Hazzard was born in Drumaness, County Down, in 1984. The eldest of four siblings, he attended Our Lady and St Patrick's College, Knock, before going to Queen's University Belfast.

Political career
Hazzard previously worked as a press officer for Sinn Féin.

He was selected by his party as a member (MLA) of the Northern Ireland Assembly to represent the South Down constituency in April 2012. He replaced his party colleague Willie Clarke, who had retired to concentrate on his local council work. Hazzard was the Minister for Infrastructure in Northern Ireland from May 2016 until the Executive's collapse in January 2017. He was also a member of the Education Committee from 2012 to 2016 and the Public Accounts Committee from 2013 to 2014.

At the snap general election held on 8 June 2017, he was elected as the MP for South Down, defeating the incumbent SDLP MP, Margaret Ritchie. It is the first time that his party have represented the seat.

Personal life
Hazzard is a Gaelic Athletic Association member and PhD candidate at Queen's University Belfast. He was, at the time of his selection, the youngest MLA.

He is married to Lisa, and the couple have a daughter, Eva, who was born in August 2015.

References

External links 
 

Living people
Members of the Parliament of the United Kingdom for County Down constituencies (since 1922)
Ministers of the Northern Ireland Executive (since 1999)
Northern Ireland MLAs 2011–2016
Northern Ireland MLAs 2016–2017
Northern Ireland MLAs 2017–2022
People educated at Our Lady and St. Patrick's College, Knock
People from County Down
Sinn Féin MLAs
Sinn Féin MPs (post-1921)
UK MPs 2017–2019
UK MPs 2019–present
1984 births
Alumni of Queen's University Belfast